This is a list of DC Comics imprint reprint collections including trade paperbacks, hardcovers, and other special format collections. DC Comics is one of the largest comic book and graphic novel publishers in North America. They have published comics under a number of different imprints and corporate names. The collections on this page include all series, mini-series, limited series, and graphic novels published under the imprints All-Star, Johnny DC, Tangent, and those Amalgam Comics published by DC.

All-Star

Amalgam Comics

Johnny DC
Some collected editions, while reprinting comics published under the Johnny DC imprint, were not published under the imprint.
{| class="wikitable"
! Title
! Vol.
!Vol. title
! Material collected
!Format
! Publication date
! ISBN
|-
| rowspan="3" | The Batman Strikes!
| 1
|Crime Time
| The Batman Strikes! #1–5
| rowspan="3" |TP
| 
| 
|-
| 2
|In Darkest Night
| The Batman Strikes! #6–10
| 
| 
|-
| 3
|Duty Calls
| The Batman Strikes! #11–14, 16–18
| 
| 
|-
| Batman: The Brave and the Bold
| 1
|
| Batman: The Brave and the Bold #1–6
|TP
| 
| 
|-
| Billy Batson and the Magic of Shazam!
| 2
|
| Billy Batson and the Magic of Shazam! #1–6
|TP
| 
| 
|-
|Bugs Bunny
|1
|What's Up Doc?
|
|TP
|
|
|-
| rowspan="4" |Cartoon Network Block Party!
|1
|Get Down!
|
| rowspan="4" |TP
|
|
|-
|2
|Read All About It!
|
|
|
|-
|3
|Can You Dig It?
|
|
|
|-
|4
|Blast Off!
|
|
|
|-
|Daffy Duck
|1
|You're Despicable!
|
|TP
|
|
|-
| rowspan="5" | Justice League Unlimited
| 1
|United They Stand
| Justice League Unlimited #1–5
| rowspan="5" |TP
| 
| 
|-
| 2
|World's Greatest Heroes
| Justice League Unlimited #6–10
| 
| 
|-
| 3
|Champions of Justice
| Justice League Unlimited #11–15
| 
| 
|-
| 4
|The Ties That Bind
| Justice League Unlimited #16–22
| 
| 
|-
| 5
|Heroes
| Justice League Unlimited #23–29
| 
| 
|-
|Justice League Unlimited
|
|Jam Packed Action
|
|TP
|
|
|-
| The Legion of Super-Heroes in the 31st Century
| 1
|Tomorrow's Heroes
| The Legion of Super-Heroes in the 31st Century #1–6
|
| March 2008
| 
|-
| rowspan="6" | Scooby-Doo
| 1
|You Meddling Kids!
| Scooby-Doo #1–5
| rowspan="6" |TP
| 
| 
|-
|2
|Ruh-Roh!
|Scooby-Doo #6–10
|
|
|-
|3
|All Wrapped Up!
|Scooby-Doo #11–15
|
|
|-
|4
|The Big Squeeze!
|Scooby-Doo #16–20
|
|
|-
|5
|Surf's Up!
|Scooby-Doo #21–25
|
|
|-
|6
|Space Fright
|Scooby-Doo #26–30
|
|
|-
| rowspan="2" | Super Friends
| 1
|For Justice
| Super Friends #1–7
| rowspan="2" |TP
| 
| 
|-
| 2
|Calling All Super Friends
| Super Friends #8–14
| 
| 
|-
| Supergirl: Cosmic Adventures in the 8th Grade
| 1
|
| Supergirl: Cosmic Adventures in the 8th Grade #1–6
|TP
| 
| 
|-
|Teen Titans
|
|Jam Packed Action
|
|TP
|
|
|-
| rowspan="5" | Teen Titans Go!
| 1
|Truth, Justice, Pizza!
| Teen Titans Go! #1–5
| rowspan="5" |TP
| 
| 
|-
| 2
|Heroes on Patrol!
| Teen Titans Go! #6–10
| 
| 
|-
| 3
|Bring It On!
| Teen Titans Go! #11–15
| 
| 
|-
| 4
|Ready for Action!
| Teen Titans Go! #16–20
| 
| 
|-
| 5
|On the Move!
| Teen Titans Go! #21–25
| 
| 
|-
| rowspan="7" | Tiny Titans
| 1
|Welcome to the Treehouse
| Tiny Titans #1–6
| rowspan="7" |TP
| 
| 
|-
| 2
|Adventures in Awesomeness
| Tiny Titans #7–12
| 
| 
|-
|3
|Sidekickin' It
|Tiny Titans #13–18
|
|
|-
|4
|The First Rule of Pet Club...
|Tiny Titans #19–25
|
|
|-
|5
|''Field Trippin|Tiny Titans #26–32
|
|
|-
|6
|The Treehouse and Beyond!
|Tiny Titans #33–38
|
|
|-
|7
|Growing Up Tiny!
|Tiny Titans #39–44
|
|
|}

TangentTangent Comics''' was a title used for two fifth-week events. The following collections include the Tangent Comics one-shots from 1997 and 1998.

 List_of_DC_imprint_reprint_collections
 List_of_DC_imprint_reprint_collections